Robert Lemuel Hunter  (1863–1956) was a Major League Baseball player for the 1883 Cleveland Blues. He appeared in one game for the Blues on September 1, 1883, appearing as both an outfielder and a pitcher in the game.

Sources

1863 births
1956 deaths
19th-century baseball players
Major League Baseball pitchers
Major League Baseball outfielders
Baseball players from Ohio
Cleveland Blues (NL) players
St. Paul Apostles players
Toledo Blue Stockings (minor league) players
People from Warren, Ohio